The 2008–09 Senior Women's One Day League was the 3rd edition of the women's List A cricket competition in India. It took place in November and December 2008, with 28 teams divided into five regional groups. Railways won the tournament, beating Maharashtra in the final, claiming their third title in three years.

Competition format
The 28 teams competing in the tournament were divided into five zonal groups: Central, East, North, South and West. The tournament operated on a round-robin format, with each team playing every other team in their group once. The top two sides from each group progressed to the Super League round, where the 10 remaining teams were divided into two further round-robin groups. The winner of each group progressed to the final. Matches were played using a 50 over format.

The groups worked on a points system with positions with the groups being based on the total points. Points were awarded as follows:

Win: 4 points. 
Tie: 2 points. 
Loss: –1 points. 
No Result/Abandoned: 2 points. 
Bonus Points: 1 point available per match. 
Consolation Points: 1 point available per match.

If points in the final table are equal, teams are separated by most wins, then head-to-head record, then number of Bonus Points, then Net Run Rate.

Zonal Tables

Central Zone

East Zone

North Zone

South Zone

West Zone

Source:CricketArchive

Super Leagues

Super League Group A

Super League Group B

Source:CricketArchive

Final

Statistics

Most runs

Source: CricketArchive

Most wickets

Source: CricketArchive

References

Women's Senior One Day Trophy
Senior Women's One Day League
Senior Women's One Day League